Shepherd Center is a private, not-for profit hospital in Atlanta, Georgia.  Founded in 1975, the 152-bed hospital focuses on the medical treatment, research and rehabilitation for people with spinal cord injury and disease, acquired brain injury, multiple sclerosis, chronic pain and other neuromuscular problems.

History 
The Shepherd Center was founded in 1975, when Harold and Alana Shepherd travelled  to find the appropriate care for their son James who was paralyzed from the neck down in a body surfing accident. Unable to find appropriate rehabilitation measures, the Shepherds brought together Atlanta's medical and donor communities to found the Shepherd Center. James served as chairman of the board of the Center prior to his death in December 2019. Alana Shepherd currently serves as the Chairperson of the Board of Directors.

Programs 
Shepherd Center treats people who have sustained a spinal cord injury. Shepherd Center's expertise has led to the development of specialized treatment programs for adolescent patients (ages 12–17), adults, seniors (ages 50 and older), dual diagnosis, intensive care unit patients and those with neuromuscular disorders.

Shepherd Center offers rehabilitation for people who have had a brain injury, as well as people who have had complications from a stroke or tumor.

The Multiple Sclerosis (MS) Institute at Shepherd is a treatment and rehabilitation center for people with multiple sclerosis. Treatment options focus on medications, physical rehabilitation and experimental therapies. The MS Institute at Shepherd offers evaluations, diagnostics, rehabilitation services and treatment options through FDA-approved drugs and new clinical trials. Shepherd is an official treatment facility designated by the National MS Society-Georgia Chapter.

The Shepherd Pain Institute offers pain management for individuals experiencing chronic pain problems. The Institute takes a multidisciplinary approach to the practice of medicine and specializes in the evaluation, diagnosis and application of interventional treatment for the management of pain and related disorders.

Specialty services 
Shepherd Center's assistive technology specialists help people with limited mobility or neurological deficits achieve a greater degree of independence by using new equipment and technology.

Patients at Shepherd Center undertake leisure and recreational activities as part of their therapy program. This type of therapy, called recreation therapy, helps improve physical, cognitive and social functioning. The Beyond Therapy program at Shepherd Center is an activity-based therapy program designed to help people with neurological disorders, including spinal cord injury, improve their lifelong health, minimize secondary complications and get the most out of any new neural links to their muscles.

Shepherd Center is one of seven rehabilitation centers that have partnered partner with the Christopher and Dana Reeve Foundation and the Centers for Disease Control and Prevention (CDC) as part of the NeuroRecovery Network (NRN), which provides and develops therapies to promote functional recovery and improve the health and quality of life of people with paralysis.

Shepherd Center offers locomotor training, an activity-based therapy that attempts to retrain the spinal cord to "remember" the pattern of walking again. This therapy is available to patients who have some movement in their legs. There are two versions of this therapy—manual-assisted locomotor training and robotic-assisted locomotor training. Both therapies involve supporting part of the patient's body weight with a harness system that suspends the patient over a moving treadmill. The amount of body weight support, treadmill speed, walking time and amount of assistance given to the patient can be adjusted in both versions to best maximize the outcome.

Research 
The Virginia C. Crawford Research Institute at Shepherd Center conducts neurological and neuromuscular research. Shepherd Center's research activities primarily focus on spinal cord injury, brain injury, multiple sclerosis and neuromuscular disorders.

The center works to develop, refine and evaluate new treatments, drugs, surgical techniques, diagnostic tools and various therapy interventions. Shepherd Center's research also works to improve the effectiveness and cost-effectiveness of clinical services, as well as document the long-term effectiveness and benefits of rehabilitation to improve patient outcomes.

Since 1982, Shepherd Center has been designated as a Model System of Care for spinal cord injury by the U.S. Department of Education’s National Institute on Disability and Rehabilitation Research (NIDRR). The hospital is one of 14 Model Systems in the country.

In 2022, the Administration for Community Living’s (ACL) National Institute on Disability, Independent Living, and Rehabilitation Research (NIDILRR) awarded a five-year grant to Shepherd Center. It recognized the rehabilitation hospital as a Traumatic Brain Injury Model System (TBIMS). It will officially be known as Georgia Model Brain Injury System at Shepherd Center.

Accreditation 
Shepherd Center is accredited by The Joint Commission and the Commission on Accreditation of Rehabilitation Facilities (CARF).

See also
Peachtree Road Race - the Shepherd Center Wheelchair Division of AJC Peachtree Road Race founded in 1982.

References

External links 
 Official site

Hospital buildings completed in 1975
Hospitals in Atlanta
Hospitals established in 1975